Dream Team is the second studio album by German singers Sarah and Pietro Lombardi. Their first collaborative effort, it was released by Polydor Records on 22 March 2013 in German-speaking Europe.

Track listing

Charts

References

2013 albums
Pietro Lombardi (singer) albums
Sarah Lombardi albums
Collaborative albums